Georgi Parvanov Vasilev (born 9 June 1945), also known as "Gocho", is a Bulgarian former footballer who played as a forward. In his career, he played for Lokomotiv Plovdiv and Pirin Gotse Delchev.

Career
He started practicing football in 1959 in Gotse Delchev. Until 1963 he played fot the team of Pirin Gotse Delchev, and after that he was transferred to Lokomotiv Plovdiv and wore the shirt of the club until 1980. He returned to Pirin Gotse Delchev, where he played until 1986 and became the top scorer of the B group at the age of 42. 

Vasilev has played in 386 games and has scored 115 goals in the A group for Lokomotiv Plovdiv. He has played 28 games and has scored 12 goals in the UEFA Cup with the smurfs, of which he is also an international top scorer. Georgi Vasilev is a vice-champion of Bulgaria for 1973, with two more bronze medals won - in 1969 and 1974 with Lokomotiv Plovdiv. He has awarded "Honorary sign of the city of Plovdiv" in 2019.

Georgi Vasilev is the only Olympic medalist in football from Plovdiv, who won silver medal in Mexico City, Mexico, in 1968. 

He has played in 17 games and has scored 10 goals fot the national team of Bulgaria, and for the youth team he has 6 games and 6 goals. He played for Bulgaria national football team at the 1968 Summer Olympics.

References

1945 births
Living people
Bulgarian footballers
Bulgaria international footballers
Association football forwards
PFC Pirin Gotse Delchev players
PFC Lokomotiv Plovdiv players
First Professional Football League (Bulgaria) players
Footballers at the 1968 Summer Olympics
Olympic footballers of Bulgaria
Olympic silver medalists for Bulgaria
Olympic medalists in football
Bulgarians from Aegean Macedonia

Medalists at the 1968 Summer Olympics
People from Sidirokastro